Geoffrey Vaughan Scammell (11 July 1925 - 2006) was a British historian and fellow of Emmanuel College, Cambridge, who was an authority on Tudor and Stuart maritime history.

Early life
Geoffrey Scammell was born on 11 July 1925 in Wallasey, Merseyside, England. Attended Wallasey Grammar School. He graduated from Emmanuel College, University of Cambridge, BA in 1948 (MA 1953).  After service at sea and a position at Durham, he became a Fellow of Pembroke College 12 years later, where he remained as a lecturer and scholar until his retirement in 1992.

Career
Scammell served in the Royal Navy as a lieutenant from 1943 to 1946. His academic career began after his war service, first as a Fellow of Emmanuel College, Cambridge and then at the University of Durham as Lecturer in Diplomatic. In 1965 he became a Fellow of Pembroke College, Cambridge. He was director of studies in history at Cambridge from 1965 to 1992 and emeritus fellow at Pembroke College from 1992.

He wrote primarily about the maritime history of the Tudor and Stuart period and was chairman of the British committee of the International Maritime History Committee from 1978 to 1989.

Death
Scammell died in Cambridge in 2006.

Selected publications
 Hugh Du Puiset: A Biography of the Twelfth-Century Bishop of Durham. Cambridge University Press, Cambridge, 1956.
 The World Encompassed: The First European Maritime Empires c.800-1650. First published in 1981 by Methuen and Co Ltd and University of California Press, Berkeley, second edition published in 2018 by Routledge, 2 Park Square, Milton Park, Abingdon, Oxon and by Routledge, 711 Third Avenue, New York, NY 10017.
 The English Chartered Trading Companies and the Sea. National Maritime Museum, London, 1983.
 The First Imperial Age: European Overseas Expansion, c.1400-1715. Unwin Hyman, London, 1989.
 Ships, Oceans and Empire: Studies in European Maritime and Colonial History, 1400-1750. Variorum, Aldershot, 1995. 
 Seafaring, Sailors and Trade, 1450-1750: Studies in British and European Maritime and Imperial History. Ashgate Variorum, Aldershot, 2003.

References

External links
 http://worldcat.org/identities/lccn-n81011144/
 http://opac.regesta-imperii.de/lang_en/autoren.php?name=Scammell%2C+Geoffrey+Vaughan

1925 births
2006 deaths
Maritime historians
English historians
Alumni of Emmanuel College, Cambridge
Academics of Durham University
Fellows of Emmanuel College, Cambridge
Fellows of Pembroke College, Cambridge
Royal Navy officers of World War II
People from Wallasey